Chris Dobey (born 31 May 1990) is an English professional darts player currently playing in Professional Darts Corporation (PDC) events. He is the current Masters champion.

Career
His first major TV appearance came in the 2015 UK Open where he lost 5–1 in the first round to Nathan Aspinall. At the 11th Players Championship of the year he had deciding leg victories over Jan Dekker, Kim Huybrechts and Max Hopp to reach the last 16 of a PDC event for the first time, where he was defeated 6–2 by Mark Webster. Dobey qualified for the 2015 World Series of Darts Finals and lost in a last leg decider to Terry Jenkins.

At the 2016 German Darts Masters, Dobey saw off Ben Davies 6–1 and then averaged 100.64 in a win over Robert Thornton and 102.25 whilst beating Dave Chisnall 6–4. In his first PDC quarter-final he averaged over 100 again, but lost 6–5 to world number one Michael van Gerwen having led 5–4. At the 19th Players Championship Dobey beat Stephen Bunting 6–3 to reach the semi-finals and took out a 120 finish after Adrian Lewis had missed match darts to play in his first professional final, which he lost 6–4 to Simon Whitlock.
He qualified for the 2016 European Championship and was eliminated 6–2 by Joe Cullen in the first round. Dobey also played in the Grand Slam of Darts for the first time and wins over Lewis and Scott Mitchell saw him advance to the knockout stage, where he hit a ten dart leg to move 9–5 up on Jamie Hughes. However, Hughes closed the deficit to force a deciding leg which Dobey took to advance to his first major quarter-final, but he was outclassed by James Wade who won 16–5.

His performances gave him a PDC Pro Tour spot in the 2017 World Championship, where he beat Justin Pipe 3–1 in the first round. In the second round he lost 4–2 to Dave Chisnall.

At the 2018 World Championship, Dobey drew Phil Taylor in the first round. Taylor was appearing in his final World Championship following his decision to retire after the conclusion of the event. Dobey lost 3-1. He played in the 2018 UK Open in Minehead, reaching the fifth round before losing out to Corey Cadby. He reached 2 finals on the Pro Tour in 2018, losing 6-2 to Michael van Gerwen at Players Championship 5 despite having an average of over 109, and then lost 6-2 to Krzysztof Ratajski at the penultimate Players Championship event of the year. These performances aided him in qualifying for the 2018 Players Championship Finals where he had a run to the quarter finals, losing out 10-2 to eventual winner Daryl Gurney.

He qualified for the 2019 PDC World Darts Championship via the Pro Tour, reaching the last 16 stage with a 3-0 win over Boris Koltsov, a 3-0 win over Steve Beaton and a 4-3 win over Vincent van der Voort. He lost 4-3 to Gary Anderson, in a match which saw 28 180s thrown, 15 of them by Dobey.

Following Gary Anderson's withdrawal from the 2019 Premier League, Dobey was selected as one of nine 'contenders'. He would play a one-off match against Mensur Suljović on night one in Newcastle. Dobey started well leading 5-1 before Suljović would win 5 consecutive legs to lead 6-5. Dobey would win the final leg to draw the match 6-6.

Dobey reached his fourth PDC final at the 2019 Danish Darts Open, winning through as a non seed, but lost it 8-3 to Dave Chisnall.

After semi-finals at both the 2019 World Grand Prix and 2019 Players Championship Finals, Dobey was once again selected for the Premier League night in Newcastle, this time under the tag of 'challenger'.

In 2021, Dobey won his first PDC ranking title the 18th Players Championship event in Coventry. Along the way he defeated Jeff Smith, Luke Humphries, William Borland, Jonny Clayton, Stephen Bunting, Maik Kuivenhoven & José de Sousa. Dobey then went on to claim his 2nd ranking title at PC28 in Barnsley including a phenomenal Semi-Final clash with Rob Cross where the pair threw a combined average of 224.68 (111.73 for Chris).

On 29 January 2023, Dobey reached his first televised final at the 2023 Masters. He beat reigning Masters champion Joe Cullen, Luke Humphries, Dirk van Duijvenbode, Michael Smith before defeating Rob Cross 11–7 in the final. The following day, Dobey was confirmed to be in the 2023 Premier League.

World Championship results

PDC
 2017: Second round (lost to Dave Chisnall 2–4)
 2018: First round (lost to Phil Taylor 1–3)
 2019: Fourth round (lost to Gary Anderson 3–4)
 2020: Fourth round (lost to Glen Durrant 3–4)
 2021: Third round (lost to Daryl Gurney 1–4)
 2022: Fourth round (lost to Luke Humphries 3–4)
 2023: Quarter-finals (lost to Michael van Gerwen 0–5)

Performance timeline

PDC European Tour

PDC career finals

PDC major finals: 1 (1 title)

Personal life 
Dobey is the cousin of fellow PDC professional player Callan Rydz.

Notes

References

External links

{{#ifexpr:<21|}}

1990 births
People from Bedlington
Sportspeople from Northumberland
Living people
English darts players
Professional Darts Corporation current tour card holders
Masters (darts) champions
21st-century English people